The following is a list of novels based in the setting of the collectible card game Magic: The Gathering. When Wizards of the Coast was asked how the novels and cards influence each other, Brady Dommermuth, Magic's Creative Director, responded by saying "generally the cards provide the world in which the novels are set, and the novels sometimes provide characters represented on cards. But cards also introduce their own characters that might not appear in the novels. In short, the Magic creative team and the novelists work largely in parallel and inform each other as much as possible." All of the novels take place in the multiverse (the center nexus of which is Dominaria), which consists of an infinite number of infinitely different planes.

The novels from The Brothers' War through Scourge, along with The Thran and the ...of Magic anthologies, are set on the plane of Dominaria and are a roughly chronological timeline of that plane's history. Magic began to venture out of Dominaria and into several new planes in the later novels such as Mirrodin (formerly Argentum) in the Mirrodin Cycle, Kamigawa in the Kamigawa Cycle, and Ravnica in the Ravnica Cycle. The Magic storyline returned to Dominaria with the Time Spiral cycle, and visited Lorwyn with the storyline cycle of the same name.  After this, the policy of publishing a trilogy of novels for each year's setting was discontinued; the Alara, Zendikar and Scars of Mirrodin block settings had only a single novel each.

Theros was the last block to receive a companion novel, and only in e-book form, with Wizards of the Coast citing various reasons including a decline in sales and an outdated model as two major contributing factors for the decision. Beginning with the Khans block in 2013, the company decided to tell the storyline through the cards and free online articles and found that more players were familiar with the block story line than were previously when only novels told the story.

This approach continued through 2017. Then, Wizards of the Coast hired novelist and scriptwriter Nic Kelman as their Head of Story and Entertainment. Kelman's task was to assemble all of the lore established from previous card sets and the published novels, comics, and other materials as to create the game's "cosmology" or the story bible that established all the known planes and elements of those planes, the individual Planeswalkers and their connections to others, and other details that then could be passed not only to the teams developing new cards but also to those expanding the franchise with new novels and other content. In 2018, Brandon Sanderson published an e-book, Children of the Nameless, marking the return of novels. War of the Spark: Ravnica (2019) by Greg Weisman was the first print book after an eight-year break. It corresponded with the final set of a three part Ravnica storyline and received a sequel. However, the sequel was widely panned and Wizards of the Coast "canceled plans for the book that was intended for the game's next set, Theros: Beyond Death". Then in 2020, with the Zendikar Rising (2020) set, the Magic storyline returned via story articles on the official website.

Non-cycle novels
The original ten books were deliberately not numbered as a marketing concern.  The publishers thought people might shy away from a multi-book series.  Some stories are connected, some not.  The heroes of Arena, Garth and Rakel, appear in Shattered Chains.  The books Whispering Woods, Shattered Chains, and Final Sacrifice are known as the "Whispering Woods Trilogy" or "The Greensleeves Trilogy".

All of the non-cycle books were published by Harper Fantasy.

Cycles and block novels

Cycle novels
All of the below cycled or series books have been published by Wizards of the Coast.

Block novels
Block novels are novels which replaced the trilogy (or tetralogy) of novels previously released corresponding to each Magic set. They were introduced in 2009 with Alara Unbroken released for the Shards of Alara block. As the name suggests the block novel follows the story of the card block of the same name.

Other novels 
These novels were connected to specific expansion sets without blocks.

Planeswalker novels
The Planeswalker novels are a type of Magic novel that was introduced in 2009. Each follows the story of one of Magic's planeswalkers. The first yearly planeswalker novel was released in the winter and the second in the summer of 2009.

Block novellas / eBooks
For the Return to Ravnica block, a 3-part novella by Doug Beyer was released. Similarly a 2 part novella by Jenna Helland was released for the Theros block.

Anthologies
The first two Anthologies, Tapestries and Distant Planes were published by Harper Fantasy while all of the others since then have been published by Wizards of the Coast.

Others

The Planeswalker's Guide Series
The Planeswalker's Guide Series was a planned series of novels which were to start with A Planeswalker's Guide to Alara in September 2008. Each novel was going to contain information, concept art, card art, etc... about the plane it is dedicated to. The series was later changed to web article series after the first book did not sell as well as the publisher hoped.

Notes

General

Specific

See also
Magic: The Gathering Card Sets
Magic: The Gathering Storylines

Magic: The Gathering
Magic: The Gathering
HarperCollins books